Mangiapane is an Italian surname. Notable people with the surname include:

Andrew Mangiapane (born 1996), Canadian ice hockey player
Frank Mangiapane (1925–2005), American basketball player

Italian-language surnames